MaxMind is a Massachusetts-based data company that provides location data for IP addresses and other data for IP addresses, and fraud detection data used to screen hundreds of millions of online transactions monthly for more than 7,000 businesses.

History 
MaxMind was founded in 2002 by Thomas "TJ" Mather and is based in Malden, Massachusetts, United States. The company sells IP geolocation and other IP address related data under the GeoIP®  brand. In 2004, MaxMind began offering the minFraud® service, a transactional risk analysis service.

MaxMind announced a corporate giving program in 2015, in which more than 50% of profits would be donated to charity. In 2022 the company announced that it donates “over 60% of profits to charities.”

Kansas Glitch 
The owners of the property at those coordinates filed a lawsuit against MaxMind, which was settled via alternative dispute resolution in September 2017.

References

External links

Companies based in Massachusetts
Data collection